Karolinowo may refer to the following places:
Karolinowo, Kuyavian-Pomeranian Voivodeship (north-central Poland)
Karolinowo, Gmina Nowe Miasto in Masovian Voivodeship (east-central Poland)
Karolinowo, Gmina Załuski in Masovian Voivodeship (east-central Poland)
Karolinowo, Żuromin County in Masovian Voivodeship (east-central Poland)